In Canada, motor vehicles are primarily powered by gasoline or diesel fuel. Other energy sources include ethanol, biodiesel, propane, compressed natural gas (CNG), electric batteries charged from an external source, and hydrogen. Canada, like most countries, has excise taxes and other taxes on gasoline, diesel, and other liquid and gas motor fuels (collectively called fuel taxes), and also taxes electricity at various administrative levels. Most provinces and territories in Canada also have taxes on these motor fuels, and some metropolitan areas such as Montreal, Greater Vancouver, and Victoria impose additional taxes.

Additionally, Canada's federal (national) government collects value-added tax (GST) across the country, and some provincial governments also collect a provincial sales tax (PST), which may be combined with the GST into a single harmonized sales tax (HST). HST, GST, or GST + PST where applicable, are calculated on the retail price including the excise taxes.

Fuel tax rates across Canada

Gasoline

Diesel

Notes

Tax revenues

The Government of Canada collects about $5 billion per year in excise taxes on gasoline, diesel, and aviation fuel  as well as approximately $1.6 billion per year from GST revenues on gasoline and diesel (net of input tax credits). The Canada Revenue Agency, a part of the government, collects these taxes.

Collectively, the provincial governments collect approximately $8 billion per year from excise taxes on gasoline and diesel.

The federal taxes go into general coffers and help to fund a range of programs: $2 billion of the approximately $5 billion collected from federal excise taxes goes into the now permanent annual Gas Tax Fund for municipal infrastructure. Provincial tax revenues usually go to fund road repair and construction, and additionally in some provinces a portion of revenues (for example, 2 cents/litre in Ontario) is also distributed directly to municipalities.

Criticism 
In March 2022, the Alberta government announced it would suspend the collection of the fuel tax starting April 1, as a way to fight the rising cost of fuel.

In Quebec, an Ipsos poll released in 2022 found that 73% of the population thought that the taxes levied on fuel were too high.

See also 
 Fuel Tax
 Fuel taxes in Australia
 Fuel taxes in the United States

References

External links 
 Oil and Gas Prices, Taxes and Consumers (Canada)
 CBC Gas Price Tracker

Canada
Taxation in Canada
Energy in Canada
Transport in Canada